The Yacht Harbour Association (TYHA) is a UK trade association for the development of coastal and inland boating facilities and for the improvement of boating and yachting.

The most important document that is produced by TYHA is the Code of Practice, which contain a list of recommendations covering every aspect of marina construction and operation.

Members

Three Gold Anchors
 Gunwharf Quays, Portsmouth, 
 Ocean Village, Southampton,

Four Gold Anchors
 Anchorage Marina, Corlette, Port Stephens, New South Wales 
 Bray Marina, Bray, 
 Bristol City Docks, Bristol, 
 Brundall Bay Marina, Norwich, 
 Cobbs Quay Marina, Poole, 
 Cowes Yacht Haven, Cowes, 
 Dart Marina, River Dart, Dartmouth, 
 De Brink Yachting, Kerkdriel, 
 Eastwood Marina, Norwich, 
 Falmouth Marina, Falmouth, 
 Hartlepool Marina, Hartlepool, 
 Jachthaven Wetterwille, Loosdrecht, 
 Milford Marina, Milford Haven, 
 Portishead Quays Marina, Portishead, 
 Queen Anne's Battery Marina, Plymouth, 
 Royal Harbour Marina Ramsgate, Ramsgate, 
 Saint Quay Port D'Armor, Saint-Quay-Portrieux
 Shepperton Marina, Shepperton, 
 Soldiers Point, Port Stephens, New South Wales 
 Tewkesbury Marina, Tewkesbury, 
 Thames and Kennet Marina, Reading, 
 Tidemill Yacht Harbour, River Deben, Woodbridge, 
 Tollesbury Marina, River Blackwater, Tollesbury, 
 Upton Marina, Upton-upon-Severn,

Five Gold Anchors
 Atakoy Marina, Atakoy, Istanbul, 
 Bangor Marina, Bangor, County Down, 
 Brighton Marina, Brighton, 
 Brixham Marina, Brixham, 
 Carrickfergus Marina, Carrickfergus, 
 Chatham Maritime Marina, River Medway, 
 Chichester Marina, Chichester, 
 Clearwater Bay Golf and Country Club Marina, Clearwater Bay, 
 Conwy Quays Marina, Conwy, 
 Discovery Bay Marina Club, Lantau Island, 
 D-Marin Turgutreis Marina, Turgutries, Bodrum, 
 Dover Marina, Dover, 
 Ecesaray Marina and Resort, Muğla, 
 Gillingham Marina, River Medway, Gillingham, 
Hafan Pwllheli, Pwllheli, 
 Hamble Point Marina, Southampton, 
 Harleyford Marina, Marlow, 
 Hythe Marina Village, Southampton, 
 Ipswich Haven Marina, Ipswich, 
 Jachthaven Naarden, Naarden, 
 Jersey Harbours, Saint Helier, 
 Kemer Turkiz Marina, Antalya, 
 Lowestoft Haven Marina, Lowestoft, 
 Marina de Lagos, Lagos, Algarve, 
 Marina Hindmarsh Island, Goolwa, South 
 Marina Muiderzand, Almere, 
 Marmaris Yacht Marina, Muğla, Marmaris, 
 Marti Marina, Muğla, 
 Mayflower Marina, Plymouth, 
 Mercury Yacht Harbour, River Hamble, 
 Milta Bodrum Marina, Bodrum, Muğla, 
 Nieuwpoort Yacht Haven, Nieuwpoort, 
 Northney Marina Hayling Island, 
 Nottingham Castle Marina, 
 One15 Marina Club Singapore, 
 Penarth Quays Marina, Penarth, 
 Penton Hook Marina, Chertsey, 
 Port Bodrum Yalikavak Marina, Mecidiyekoy, Istanbul, 
 Port Gocek Marina, Fethiye/Muğla, 
 Port Hamble Marina, Southampton, 
 Port Solent Marina, Port Solent, Portsmouth Harbour, 
 Raffles Marina 
 Royal Phuket Marina Muang, Phuket, 
 Royal Prince Alfred Yacht Club, Newport, New South Wales, 
 Royal Quays Marina, North Shields, 
 Salterns Marina, Poole Harbour, 
 Shamrock Quay Marina, Southampton, 
 Sovereign Harbour Marina, Eastbourne, 
 Swansea Marina Swansea, 
 Torquay Marina Torquay, 
 Windsor Marina Windsor, 
 Woolverstone Marina, River Orwell, Ipswich,

External links
The Yacht Harbour Association (Official site)

References

Yachting associations